Yuriko Lily Miyazaki (born 11 November 1995) is a Japanese-born British tennis player. 

Miyazaki has career-high rankings by the Women's Tennis Association (WTA) of 178 in singles and 223 in doubles. She has won five singles titles and six doubles titles on tournaments of the ITF Women's Circuit.

Personal life
Miyazaki settled in London aged 10, having previously resided in Tokyo and then Switzerland. She trained at Sutton Tennis Academy up until the age of 18. She switched to British nationality in March 2022, as Japanese citizens are not allowed to hold dual citizenship.

Miyazaki attended the University of Oklahoma (2014–2019), where she completed an undergraduate degree in Mathematics followed by a Masters in Information Technology Management.

Career
Miyazaki made her WTA Tour main-draw debut at the 2021 Transylvania Open, partnering Anastasia Gasanova in the doubles tournament. She made her WTA Tour singles debut at the 2022 Lyon Open, after qualifying for the main draw. Miyazaki switched from representing Japan to Great Britain in March 2022.

In June 2022, it was announced that Miyazaki had been awarded a main-draw wildcard for the 2022 Wimbledon Championships, where she made her Grand Slam debut.

In October 2022, Miyazaki won her first $60K title in Glasgow beating former top 40 player, and compatriot, Heather Watson 5–7, 7–6(5), 6–2 in the finals, coming back from a set and a double break down.

Grand Slam performance timelines

Singles

ITF Circuit finals

Singles: 10 (5 titles, 5 runner–ups)

Doubles: 10 (6 titles, 4 runner-ups)

Notes

References

External links
 
 

1995 births
Living people
Japanese female tennis players
British female tennis players
Tennis people from Greater London
Sportspeople from Tokyo
Oklahoma Sooners women's tennis players
British people of Japanese descent
Japanese emigrants to the United Kingdom
Naturalised citizens of the United Kingdom